Jack Walter Williams (December 1885–unknown) was an English footballer who played in the Football League for Bury and Clapton Orient.

References

1885 births
English footballers
Association football forwards
English Football League players
Hebburn Argyle F.C. players
Bury F.C. players
Nelson F.C. players
Leyton Orient F.C. players
Leyton F.C. players
Year of death missing